Anwar Zaheer Jamali ( born 31 December 1951) is a Pakistani jurist who served as the 24th Chief Justice of Pakistan. He remained in the Supreme Court from 3 August 2009 to 30 December 2016. He has also served as the Acting Chief Election Commissioner of Pakistan, and Chief Justice of the Sindh High Court. In 1995, he was elected as Chairman Executive Committee (CEC) of the Sindh Bar Council and held this position till his elevation to the Bench. He was highly praised for being one of the few judges who refused to take fresh oath under the Provisional Constitutional Order No.1 of 2007. He took several suo motos as a Chief Justice, notably on several human rights cases.

Early life and education 
Jamali hails from the noble, religious family of Qutub Jamal-ud-Din Hansvi, the disciple of Baba Fariduddin Ganjshakar and is a direct descendant of Imam Abu Hanifa.

His parents migrated from Jaipur, India in 1947. He was born in Hyderabad (Sindh) on 30 December 1951.  He received his bachelor's degree in Commerce from the University of Sindh in 1971 and a bachelor's degree in law in 1973 from the same university.

Professional career 
He was enrolled at the Sindh Bar Council as an Advocate of the Lower Court on 10.01.1975 and as an Advocate of the Sindh High Court on 13.11.1977.  He was enrolled as an Advocate of the Supreme Court on 14.05.1987. He also served as lecturer at Hyderabad (Sindh) Law College for about two years.

Judicial
Jamali was elevated as judge of the Sindh High Court in May 1998. He was nominated as Administrative Judge for the Sindh High Court on 7 June 2006 and continued as such till 3 November 2007 when he refused to take fresh oath under the Provisional Constitutional Order No.1 of 2007.  He was reappointed as Judge and Chief Justice of the Sindh High Court on 27 August 2008. He was elevated as judge of the Supreme Court of Pakistan on 3 August 2009 and appointed as Acting Chief Election Commissioner of the Election Commission of Pakistan on 3 July 2014. He was appointed as 24th Chief Justice of Pakistan on 10 September 2015 by President Mamnoon Hussain.

Other positions 
President District Bar Association Hyderabad in the years 1983-84, 1995–96, 1996–97 and 1997-98.
Elected Member, Sindh Bar Council from Hyderabad Division for two terms of five years each in the years 1989 and 1990.
Elected Chairman Benevolent Fund Committee of Sindh Bar Council in the year 1991.
Elected Chairman Executive Committee of Sindh Bar Council in the year 1995.
Member Board of Governors for the Government Law College in Sindh (excluding Karachi).
Member Syndicate NED University of Engineering and Technology, Karachi in November 1999.
Chairman Enrollment Committee, Sindh Bar Council in March 2000.
Chairman Provincial Zakat Council Sindh for a term of three years, December 2003.

See also 
Sindh High Court
Supreme Court of Pakistan

References

External links 
www.supremecourt.gov.pk/

1951 births
Living people
Chief justices of Pakistan
Pakistani judges
People from Hyderabad District, Pakistan
University of Sindh alumni
Chief Justices of the Sindh High Court